The Thermal Emission Imaging System (THEMIS) is a camera on board the 2001 Mars Odyssey orbiter.  It images Mars in the visible and infrared parts of the electromagnetic spectrum in order to determine the thermal properties of the surface and to refine the distribution of minerals on the surface of Mars as determined by the Thermal Emission Spectrometer (TES).  Additionally, it helps scientists to understand how the mineralogy of Mars relates to its landforms, and it can be used to search for thermal hotspots in the Martian subsurface.

THEMIS is managed from the Mars Space Flight Facility at Arizona State University and was built by the Santa Barbara Remote Sensing division of Raytheon Technologies Corporation, an American multinational conglomerate headquartered in Waltham, Massachusetts.  The instrument is named after Themis, the goddess of justice in ancient Greek mythology.

Infrared camera

THEMIS detects thermal infrared energy emitted by the Martian surface at nine different wavelengths.  Eight of these have wavelengths between 6 and 13 micrometers, an ideal region of the infrared spectrum to determine thermal energy patterns characteristic  of silicate minerals. The ninth band is at 14.9 micrometers and is used to monitor the Martian atmosphere.  The shortest infrared wavelength, at 6.78 micrometers, is measured twice in two bands to improve the signal-to-noise ratio.  THEMIS is therefore a 10-band instrument that detects nine different wavelengths .

The absorption spectrum measured by THEMIS contains two kinds of information: temperature and emissivity.  The temperature contribution to the measurement dominates the spectrum unless the data is corrected.  In effect, a THEMIS infrared image taken during the day will look much like a shaded relief map, with slopes facing the sun being bright (hot) and shaded areas being dark (cold).  In a THEMIS image taken at night, however, thermophysical properties of the surface can be inferred, such as temperature differences due to the materials' grain size (thermal inertia).

The effect of temperature can be removed from THEMIS infrared data by dividing the image by a black body curve.  The resulting energy pattern is an emissivity spectrum characteristic of the specific minerals (or other things) found on the surface.  The presence of minerals such as carbonates, silicates, hydroxides, sulfates, amorphous silica, oxides, and phosphates can be determined from THEMIS measurements.

In particular, this multi-spectral method allows researchers to detect the presence of minerals that form in water and to understand those minerals in their geological context.

The THEMIS infrared camera was designed to be used in conjunction with data from the Thermal Emission Spectrometer (TES), a similar instrument on Mars Global Surveyor.  While THEMIS has a very high spatial resolution (100 m) with a low spectral resolution of only 10 bands between 6 and 15 micrometers, TES has a low spatial resolution (3×6 km) with very high spectral resolution of 143 bands between 5 and 50 micrometers.

The instrument's approach provides data on localized deposits associated with volcanoes, hydrothermal processes, and the alteration of minerals by surface and/or subsurface water.

The Advanced Spaceborne Thermal Emission and Reflection Radiometer (ASTER), an Earth orbiting instrument on the Terra spacecraft, has used a similar approach to map the distribution of minerals on Earth.  Variations in the thermal infrared false-color image are due to differences in the minerals that make up rocks and soil.

Discovery of a variety of rocks 

THEMIS found a wide range of igneous rocks and minerals.  Some of the rocks were low-silica basalts, high silica dacite, olivine basalts, ultramafic (picritic) basalts, and quartz-bearing granitoid rocks. The olivine basalts were present in a variety of locations, such as on crater floors and in some canyon wall layers. The mineral olivine is important because it is common in more primitive magmas from the mantle and it weathers quickly when moisture is present. So, if olivine is present, the climate must have been dry since the time that olivine was exposed. Quartz-bearing rocks were found in the central uplifts in craters. Rocks in the central uplifts were probably once buried several kilometers beneath the surface, but raised by the impact process. Rocks of dacite composition show that, within magma chambers, fractional crystallization occurred. In this process, some minerals form crystals, then settle to the bottom of the chamber. Having a variety of rocks increases the chances that some useful/valuable minerals may be found on Mars.

Visible camera
THEMIS  has a visible imaging camera that acquires data in five spectral bands, takes images with a spatial resolution of 18 m (59'), and can resolve objects about the size of a semi-trailer. This resolution is intermediate between large-scale images from the Viking Orbiters (150 to 300 meters per pixel) and the high-resolution images from the Mars Orbiter Camera (MOC) on board Mars Global Surveyor (1.5 to 3 meters per pixel).  Visible images from THEMIS are usually close to 20 km wide (12 miles).

The THEMIS visible camera's stated purpose is to determine the geological record of past liquid and volcanic environments on Mars. Additionally, this dataset can be used in conjunction with the infrared data to identify potential landing sites for future Mars missions.

Images from the Oxia Palus quadrangle

Images from Coprates quadrangle

Images from Lunae Palus quadrangle

Images from Margaritifer Sinus quadrangle

Images from Phoenicis Lacus quadrangle

Images from Hellas quadrangle

Images from Memnonia quadrangle

Other Images from THEMIS

Bopolu crater

Specifications

The Thermal Emission Imaging System weighs 11.2 kilograms (24.7 lb), is 54.5 x 37 x 28.6 cm (21.5 x 14.6 x 11.3 in) and runs on 14 watts of electrical power.

See also
Mars Student Imaging Project (MSIP)

References

External links
 THEMIS Specifications
 THEMIS instrument site at Arizona State University
 Searchable database of THEMIS data, including detailed information on individual observations
 Public data releases of THEMIS data
 Maps of Mars images including THEMIS, MOC, HiRISE, CTX, HRSC, and Viking

2001 Mars Odyssey
Mars imagers